Colin Fitzgerald (born 26 November 1955) is an Australian former cyclist. He competed in the team pursuit event at the 1980 Summer Olympics.

References

External links
 

1955 births
Living people
Australian male cyclists
Olympic cyclists of Australia
Cyclists at the 1980 Summer Olympics
Place of birth missing (living people)
Commonwealth Games medallists in cycling
Commonwealth Games gold medallists for Australia
Australian track cyclists
Cyclists at the 1978 Commonwealth Games
Medallists at the 1978 Commonwealth Games